The  Wichita Falls Nighthawks season was the third and final season for the professional indoor football franchise and second in the Indoor Football League (IFL). One of ten teams that compete in the IFL for the 2017 season, the Nighthawks were members of the United Conference.

Led by head coach Billy Back, the Nighthawks played their home games at the Kay Yeager Coliseum in Wichita Falls, Texas.

Staff

Schedule
Key:

Regular season

All start times are local time

Standings

Roster

References

External links
 Wichita Falls Nighthawks official statistics

Wichita Falls Nighthawks
Wichita Falls Nighthawks
Wichita Falls Nighthawks